General elections were held in Barbados on 4 December 1961. They were the first held after Barbados was granted full self-government earlier in the year. 24 MPs were elected across twelve two-member constituencies, using the block vote method.

Although the incumbent Barbados Labour Party (BLP) received more votes, the non-proportional electoral system allowed the opposition Democratic Labour Party (DLP) to win 14 of the 24 seats and form a government for the first time. Among the defeated BLP candidates was the Premier Hugh Gordon Cummins, who lost his St. Thomas seat. This was also the last time an independent was elected to the Assembly, with trade union leader Frank Leslie Walcott winning a seat in the St. Peter constituency. Voter turnout was 61.3%.

Results

References

Barbados
1961 in Barbados
Elections in Barbados
West Indies Federation
December 1961 events in North America